The African bush squirrels are a genus of squirrels, Paraxerus, in the subfamily Xerinae. They are only found in Africa. The 11 species in this genus are:
Alexander's bush squirrel (P. alexandri)
Boehm's bush squirrel (P. boehmi)
Smith's bush squirrel (P. cepapi)
Cooper's mountain squirrel (P. cooperi)
Striped bush squirrel (P. flavovittis)
Black and red bush squirrel (P. lucifer)
Ochre bush squirrel (P. ochraceus)
Red bush squirrel (P. palliatus)
Green bush squirrel (P. poensis)
Swynnerton's bush squirrel (P. vexillarius)
Vincent's bush squirrel (P. vincenti)

References

https://web.archive.org/web/20070329003419/http://www.squirrels.org/names.html (Domain for sale)

 
Taxa named by Charles Immanuel Forsyth Major